Phantom Life is a Canadian drama film, directed by Jacques Leduc and released in 1992. An adaptation of the novel by Danièle Sallenave, the film stars Ron Lea as Pierre, an academic at the Université de Sherbrooke who is torn between his marriage to Annie (Johanne-Marie Tremblay) and his extramarital affair with the younger Laure (Pascale Bussières).

The film's cast also includes Gabriel Gascon, Rita Lafontaine, Jean-Guy Bouchard and Élise Guilbault.

The film premiered at the 1992 Montreal World Film Festival, where it was named the most popular Canadian film of the festival and Bussières won the award for Best Actress.

The film received five Genie Award nominations at the 13th Genie Awards, for Best Adapted Screenplay (Leduc and Yvon Rivard), Best Cinematography (Pierre Mignot), Best Art Direction/Production Design (Louise Jobin), Best Costume Design (Michèle Hamel) and Best Sound Editing (Jérôme Décarie, Diane Boucher, Michel Bordeleau, Francine Poirier and Claude Beaugrand).

References

External links

1992 films
Canadian drama films
Films set in Quebec
Films shot in Quebec
Films based on French novels
Films directed by Jacques Leduc
French-language Canadian films
1990s Canadian films